Gberi is an ethnic group in Sudan. Its members speak Mo'da, one of the Nilo-Saharan languages. 
The number of persons in this group may be below 1000.

References
Joshua Project

Ethnic groups in Sudan